Bartaman Patrika is an Indian Bengali daily newspaper published from Kolkata, West Bengal, India, by Bartaman Pvt. Ltd. Apart from the Kolkata edition, the newspaper has three other simultaneous editions, published daily from three major towns of West Bengal: Siliguri, Burdwan, and Midnapore. Bartaman is the second-most widely circulated Bengali newspaper in West Bengal after Anandabazar Patrika.

History
The newspaper was founded on 7 December 1984 by Barun Sengupta, a former Anandabazar Patrika journalist. Sengupta died on 19 June 2008 at Kolkata. 
During the Left Front regime, Bartaman Patrika was known for his staunch  anti-communist and anti-establishment views. However, in the Trinamool Congress regime Bartaman Patrika works as a mouthpiece of Mamata Banerjee. Since April 2002, Bartaman Patrika has published an online version (https://bartamanpatrika.com) and in the year of 2006 Bartaman launched it's Mobile App version. Also in 2022 Bartaman published Hindi daily named Bartaman Patrika.

Competition
Bartamans main competitor is Anandabazar Patrika, published since 1922. Bartaman holds second position after Anandabazar Patrika in West Bengal, by readership and circulation; its daily circulation is roughly about 60% of that of Anandabazar Patrika.

References

External links
  
 History of  Bartaman Patrika Bengali Newspaper

Newspapers published in Kolkata
Bengali-language newspapers published in India
Publications established in 1984
1984 establishments in West Bengal